Herpetogrammatini is a tribe of the species-rich subfamily Spilomelinae in the pyraloid moth family Crambidae. The tribe was erected by Richard Mally, James E. Hayden, Christoph Neinhuis, Bjarte H. Jordal and Matthias Nuss in 2019.

Six genera, altogether comprising 269 species, are currently placed in Herpetogrammatini:
Blepharomastix Lederer, 1863 (= Ichthyoptila Meyrick, 1936, Sozoa Walker, 1866)
Cryptobotys Munroe, 1956
Eurrhyparodes Snellen, 1880 (= Molybdantha Meyrick, 1884)
Herpetogramma Lederer, 1863 (= Acharana Moore, 1885, Coremataria Amsel, 1956, Culcitaria Amsel, 1957, Macrobotys Munroe, 1950, Pachyzancla Meyrick, 1884, Pantoeocome Warren, 1896, Piloptila Swinhoe, 1894, Ptiloptila Hampson, 1899, Stenomelas Hampson, 1912, Stenomeles Warren, 1892)
Hileithia Snellen, 1875
Pilocrocis Lederer, 1863 (= Anisoctena Meyrick, 1894, Pilocrosis Janse, 1917)

References

Spilomelinae
Moth tribes